Maelog was a 6th-century pre-congregational saint of Wales and a child of King Caw of Strathclyde.

He was the patron Saint of Llanfaelog, where he built his church.

References

Medieval Welsh saints
6th-century Christian saints
5th-century Welsh people
5th-century births
Roman Catholic monks
Welsh Roman Catholic saints
Year of birth unknown
Year of death unknown